This is the list of number-one tracks on the ARIA Club Chart in 2014, and is compiled by the Australian Recording Industry Association (ARIA) from weekly DJ reports.

2014

Number-one artists

See also
ARIA Charts
List of number-one singles of 2014 (Australia)
List of number-one albums of 2014 (Australia)
List of number-one dance singles of 2014 (Australia)
2014 in music

References

Number-one singles
Australia Club Chart
2014 Club